Nathalie, Secret Agent (French: Nathalie, agent secret) is a 1959 French-Italian comedy thriller film directed by Henri Decoin and starring Martine Carol, Félix Marten and Darío Moreno. It is a sequel to the 1957 film Nathalie starring Carol in the title role with Dany Saval also reprising her role as Pivoine. It was shot at the Billancourt Studios in Paris. The film's sets were designed by the art director Robert Clavel.

Synopsis
After her friend falls in love with an engineer, Parisian model Nathalie attends a demonstration at the top secret factory at which he works. She is then arrested by the security services who believe she is working as a spy for a foreign power. Escaping she enlists the help of a friendly police officer and sets out to trap the real spies.

Cast
 Martine Carol as 	Nathalie Princesse
 Félix Marten as 	Jacques Fabre
 Darío Moreno as Docteur Alberto / Don José
 Noël Roquevert as 	Pierre Darbon
 Howard Vernon as William Dantoren
 Jacques Berthier as 	Jean Darbon
 André Versini as 	François Pellec
 Dany Saval as 	Pivoine
 Guy Decomble as Pageot
 Catherine Conti as 	La vendeuse de cigarettes

References

Bibliography 
 Chiti, Roberto & Poppi, Roberto. Dizionario del cinema italiano: Dal 1945 al 1959. Gremese Editore, 1991.
 Goble, Alan. The Complete Index to Literary Sources in Film. Walter de Gruyter, 1999.

External links 
 

1959 films
French spy comedy films
Italian spy comedy films
1950s spy comedy films
1959 comedy films
1950s French-language films
Films directed by Henri Decoin
Films based on French novels
French sequel films
Films shot at Billancourt Studios
1950s French films
1950s Italian films